Dinendra Ruwan Wijewardene (Sinhala:දිනෙන්ද්‍ර රුවන් විජෙවර්ධන) (born 4 August 1975) (known as Ruwan Wijewardene) is a Sri Lankan politician and currently the Senior advisor to president (Ranil Wickremesinghe) on Climate change. He was the former State Minister of Defence and former Mass Media non-cabinet Minister. He was a former Member of Parliament for Gampaha District. Also he is the Deputy Leader of the United National Party and chief organiser for Kelaniya Electorate.  
 
Prior to entering parliament in 2010, he was a member of the Western Provincial Council. He was appointed as the acting minister of defence few times after 2019.

Early life
Born to a political dynasty, he is the youngest son of Ranjani Senanayake and Ranjith Wijewardene (Chairman of Wijeya Newspapers). His maternal great grandfather, Rt Hon D.S Senanayake, was the first prime minister of Ceylon and his grand uncle, Dudley Senanayake,  was the second prime minister of Ceylon and went on to become prime minister two more times during the 1950s and 1960s. His paternal grandfather, D. R. Wijewardena, was a press baron who was a leader in the Sri Lankan independence movement. A successful entrepreneur, he established Lake House newspapers and played a major role in the independence movement. Ruwan Wijewardene is a nephew of the first executive president  J.R. Jayewardene  of Sri Lanka and the cousin of Ranil Wickremesinghe, the current President of Sri Lanka.

Education
Wijewardene completed his primary and secondary education at  St. Thomas' Preparatory School. He then pursued further studies at the University of Sussex  in the United Kingdom, where he earned a BA in Political science.

Political career
Wijewardene contested the Western Provincial elections in 2009 and was a member of the Western Provincial Council until 2010. He stood for parliamentary elections 2010 and secured the highest number of preference votes from Gampaha District. He lost his seat in parliament in 2020 general elections. He was elected as deputy leader of the UNP on 14th September 2020 and he is tipped to be the next Leader of the United National Party.

See also
List of political families in Sri Lanka 	
List of Govigama people

References

External links
Wijewardene Ancestry
 The Senanayake Ancestry
Sri Lanka Parliament profile
Sri Lanka blasts: Lanka's Deputy Defence Minister Ruwan Wijewardene talks to WION. WION.

1975 births
Living people
Sri Lankan Buddhists
United National Party politicians
Alumni of the University of Sussex
Provincial councillors of Sri Lanka
Members of the 14th Parliament of Sri Lanka
Members of the 15th Parliament of Sri Lanka
Alumni of S. Thomas' Preparatory School, Kollupitiya
State ministers of Sri Lanka
Ruwan
Sinhalese politicians
Ruwan